Étoile Cay is an uninhabited circular coral cay in Seychelles, lying in the Amirantes group of the Outer Islands of Seychelles, with a distance of 302 km south of Victoria, Seychelles.

History
Étoile Cay was named after a ship used in Bougainville's famous voyage round the world, from 1766 to 1769. It was explored and named by the Chevalier du Roslan in 1771.

Geography
Étoile Cay lies 29 km northeast of Boudeuse Cay, and 32 km Southwest of Poivre Atoll. It lies on a coral reef about 1.6 km in diameter. The cay is treeless. The only vegetation is grass and low shrubs, fringed by a steep sandy beach. Landing is easy during calm weather.

Administration
The island belongs to Outer Islands District.

Flora & Fauna
The island has been identified as an Important Bird Area (IBA) by BirdLife International because it is one of only three known locations in Seychelles which are nesting sites of Roseate terns (about 150 pairs). Also spotted are Sooty terns (about 5000 pairs) and Brown noddys (about 1000 pairs). All three species breed in dense colonies during the south-east monsoon season.

green and hawksbill sea turtles also nest there.

Image gallery

References

External links 

 2010 Sailing directions

Islands of Outer Islands (Seychelles)
Important Bird Areas of Seychelles
Seabird colonies
Uninhabited islands of Seychelles